Gen12 is a comic book series from Wildstorm by Brandon Choi with art by Michael Ryan. It was a 5-issue mini-series published in 1998. It featured characters from the series Team 7. It is also the codename for the subjects of a scientific experiment within the Wildstorm Universe.

Publication history
The story takes place in the 90s, but is filled with flashbacks that take place in the late 70s/early 80s, following events in the Team 7: Dead Reckoning mini-series.

After the death of Miles Craven, head of International Operations, the US government orders commander Thomas Morgan to investigate Miles Craven's secret operation, Project Genesis, the resulting defection of John Lynch and the disappearance of Ivana Baiul. The main subjects of Project Genesis were the members of Team 7 and Morgan tracks down their friends and families to find out what happened between Craven and Team 7.

The purpose of the Gen12 series was to provide the connection between the stories in Chuck Dixon's Team 7-series (taking place in the 70s) and the Wildstorm titles taking place in the 90s. This made Gen12 a very continuity-filled series. The series was filled with references to and characters from Gen¹³, Divine Right, Deathblow and many more.

Fictional History
Miles Craven, head of International Operations was determined to create superhuman soldiers for his army and therefore started Project: Genesis. The most promising method of creating superhumans was the Gen-factor, a substance with the ability to bestow superhuman powers on people exposed to it, making them Gen-actives. The Gen-factor was discovered by Dr. Simon Tsung, who had extracted it from Ethan McCain, a baby he had found with superhuman powers. Craven used the Gen-factor on many subjects, but all either died, went insane or mutated into monstrous beings. He finally succeeded with Team 7 and the survivors of the experiment were labeled Gen12. Later other Gen12-superhumans were seen, but the Team 7 members appeared to be the most successful and the most powerful of the Gen12.

A revival of Project Genesis about 20 years later produced Gen¹³. The name Gen¹³ is only used for the members of the superhero group Gen¹³, while other Gen-Actives of their generation simply refer to themselves as Gen-Active (like DV8)  Gen12 and Gen¹³ refer to generations of Americans.

References
Gen12 @ comicbookdb

1998 comics debuts
WildStorm limited series